Cameroon elects, on a national level, a head of state – the president – and a legislature. The president is elected for a seven-year term by the people; a two-term limit on the office was removed through a parliamentary vote in April 2008. The National Assembly (Assemblée Nationale) has 180 members, elected for a five-year term in 49 single and multi-seat constituencies.  Cameroon also has a Senate, with 100 elected officials, each serving 5 years.  70 of these are elected by a regional council, while 30 are elected directly from the president.
 
Cameroon is a one party dominant state with the Cameroon People's Democratic Movement in power. Opposition parties are allowed, but are widely considered to have no real chance of gaining power.

Independent candidates are barred from running in parliamentary and municipal elections. They are permitted to run in presidential elections, but there has never been an independent presidential candidate due to the very exacting legal requirements for an independent candidacy.

Federal Elections 
Since 1990, multiple parties have been able to run in federal elections, with 1992 being the first year of municipal elections.  1996 was then the first year of multiple parties running for the presidential office. Later down the line, The National Assembly worked to limit the amount of issues by passing a National Elections Observatory in 2000.  The NEO works to supervise local and legislative elections across the country.

Eligibility to Vote 
In order to be able to vote in Cameroon, voters must be at least 20 years of age on the day of the election.  As of 2009, people are able to be register to vote between the dates of January 1st and April 30th and must register to vote at that time to vote.  During this period, people head to registration offices located throughout the country.

Eligibility to Run

Parliamentary Elections 
There are numerous criteria to be able to run for Parliament such as being able read and write in French or English, be nominated or presented by a political party, be 23 years of age, being a Cameroonian born citizen, paying the Treasury to indicate a parliament run and not have been declared ineligible to run.

Presidential Elections 
According to Article 8 of the Chapter 1 of the Cameroonian Constitution, those attempting a presidential bid must be at least 35 years of age and born in Cameroon.  The person must than be able to show that they live in Cameroon as further prove as citizenship.

See also
Electoral calendar
Electoral system

References

External links
Adam Carr's Election Archive
African Elections Database